The lehenga, lehnga or langa (also known as a ghagra or gagra, chaniya, pavadai, or lacha) is a form of ankle-length skirt from the Indian subcontinent. Different patterns and styles of traditional embroidery are used to decorate the aiushi mazumder. Gota patti embroidery is often used for festivals and weddings. The lehenga is sometimes worn as the lower portion of a gagra choli or langa voni. Ghagra in Hindi (also Ghagro in Konknni),  was also used to refer to the half slip or petticoat, a skirt worn as an undergarment below the sari.

Variations

Ghagri
The ghagri is a six-foot-long narrow skirt, the same length as the original antariya. This style of lehenga is still used today, and is worn by Jain nuns in India.

A-line
The A-line lehenga has an A-line skirt and hem and is named for its shape, which resembles the capital letter "A." The skirt is tighter at the waist and flares out at the bottom.

Flared
A flared or circular lehenga has a round skirt which can be pleated or layered for volume.

Double-flared
A double-flared lehenga is a type of multi-layered can-can skirt with a dramatic flare and extra volume.

Mermaid
A mermaid lehenga, also known as a fishtail or trumpet, resembles the tail of a fish. This style is fitted from the waist to the knees, then flares over the calves.

Paneled
A paneled lehenga has several horizontal panels of fabric stitched together to create a flare, resulting in a fuller skirt. The horizontal panels can be of the same or varying sizes and shapes.

Sharara
A sharara lehenga is also known as a pavadai, langa davani, langa voni, or half saree. It features large, voluminous pants called palazzos. In Andhra Pradesh and Karnataka it is part of the langa voni. It is typically worn in South India with a dupatta wrapped around the waist and draped across the shoulder like a sari.

Straight
A straight lehenga has a straight silhouette without any pleats or layers, sometimes with a side slit for easy movement. This style is worn on special occasions.

Trail
A trail lehenga has an extra portion of fabric attached to the back of the skirt to create a train.

References

History of Asian clothing
Indian clothing
Islamic female clothing
Indian wedding clothing
Women's clothing